Coppen is a surname. Notable people with the surname include:

 Alec Coppen (1923–2019), British psychiatrist
 Charles Coppen, a sports editor for the Providence Journal
 Shirley Coppen (born 1946), Canadian politician

See also
 Coppens (disambiguation)
 Koppen (disambiguation)